Romeo Kambou (born 13 November 1980 in Upper Volta) is a Burkinabé international footballer, who last played as striker for Sarawak FA. He previously played for clubs in the United Arab Emirates and Qatar as well as in Burkina Faso.

External links

1980 births
Living people
Burkinabé footballers
Burkina Faso international footballers
Burkinabé expatriate sportspeople in Malaysia
1998 African Cup of Nations players
Expatriate footballers in Malaysia
US des Forces Armées players
Al-Wakrah SC players
Association football forwards
21st-century Burkinabé people